"Adiós Amor" is a 1967 hit French-language song by French singer Sheila. It was one of the series of four hit singles in 1967 which made her best-selling artist of the year. Lyrics were by Jacques Plante, music by Claude Carrère and the recording was produced by American Sam Clayton.  The song begins "Je ressens de l'amour pour toi."

Releases
On the B-side was "La Porte En Bois", a French cover of "Mr. Abercrombie Taught Me" by Murray & G. Aber, fitted to new French lyrics by Claude Carrère. An EP version included two more song "Le Jour Le Plus Beau De L'ete" by Kluger and André Salvet, and "Tout Le Monde Aime Danser", a version of the Podell song "Everybody Loves Saturday Night" arranged by Carrère and Plante. It also featured as the title track in the 1969 compilation album Adiós Amor. Sheila recorded an Italian version for the Italian market.

References

1967 singles
1967 songs
Songs written by Claude Carrère
Philips Records singles